The 2004–05 season was Stade de Reims's 74th season in existence and the club's first season back in the second division of French football. In addition to the domestic league, Reims participated in this season's editions of the Coupe de France, and the Coupe de la Ligue.

Transfers

In

Competitions

Overall record

Ligue 2

League table

Results summary

Results by round

Matches

Coupe de France

Coupe de la Ligue

References

Reims
Stade de Reims seasons